Walsall Wood is a suburb split between both Brownhills and Aldridge in the Metropolitan Borough of Walsall, West Midlands, England.

History
In the late-18th century and early-19th century, the workers of Walsall Wood were primarily involved in the mining of limestone. In 1864, the population of the settlement expanded as Walsall Wood Colliery was opened, as well as another colliery in nearby Shelfield. The Walsall Wood Colliery purchased the Pelsall Colliery from Pelsall Coal & Iron Co. in 1894. The opening of the Walsall Wood Colliery saw the establishment of the first public services, including a police station and a post office. The mine was closed in 1964 when the supply of accessible coal had been exhausted: In 2010 a memorial pithead designed by Luke Perry was erected to commemorate the historic village's mining heritage. The pithead is one of a number of additions by artist Luke Perry. The Fisherman located next to the bridge on the high Street. This piece had to be mounted on a three-metre plinth to allow it to be seen from the road. Despite the height of the work inspired locals replaced the fish which originally hung from the rod with a golden wellington boot, they then swapped that for the Olympic rings in July 2012.

St John's Church in Walsall Wood was constructed in 1837 at a cost of £1,200. The church, with its quadrangular tower, is in the Gothic style, whilst the parsonage house is in the Elizabethan style. The church is constructed out of blue brick with stone dressings and has a capacity of 400. The current minister-in-charge is Reverend David Paul Simon Babbington.

Local government
Walsall Wood is part of the Aldridge North and Walsall Wood ward, in the Aldridge-Brownhills constituency, the MP of which is presently Wendy Morton, taking over from Richard Shepherd (Conservative). The area is represented by three Conservative councillors, Karl Brookhouse, Russell Bird and James Powell.

2011 census information
The population in 2011 was 13,207 a 2.5% increase from 2001. 48.9% of the population being Male and 51.1% Female.
42.3 years old is the mean average age of a resident in the area.

Ethnicity Breakdown:
White (British) – 93.6% (12,362)
White (Other) – 1.5% (195)
Mixed – 1.7% (224)
Asian – 2.1% (283)
Black – 0.8% (105)
Other – 0.3% (38)

Unemployment for the area was 4.7%. The borough of Walsall 6.8%.

Education
Shire Oak School is located in Walsall Wood with 96% of pupils achieving 5 or more A*-C grade GCSEs in 2013. Walsall Wood is also home to Castlefort Junior School, St Johns Junior School and Walsall Wood Junior School.

Sport

Walsall Wood F.C. is a football club competing in the Midland Football League 1st Division at level 10, they play their home games at their ground located at Oak Park.

Walsall Wood was also home to Formula 1 team Ensign Racing from 1973 to 1980 being based opposite Castlefort Primary School. Their best result being a 4th place in the 1981 Brazilian GP They later relocated to Burntwood until 1982.

Recreation and entertainment

Oak Park is a recreation centre located in Lichfield Road in Walsall Wood, which opened in 1974. This centre consists of two swimming pools, an astro-turf football pitch, bowls lawn (mostly flooded), BMX & Skate Park (mostly unused) along with other sporting facilities. The centre moved to Coppice Road in Walsall Wood in 2016. The Lichfield Road centre was demolished in 2017.

Walsall Wood also has a high number of pubs, including The Drunken Duck on Walsall Wood High Street, The Boatman's Rest also on the High Street, The Royal Exchange and Brickmakers Arms.

There is an on-site KFC restaurant located right next to the parking for the Oak Park facility. Across the road from Oak Park is a Fitness First gym, a Co-Operative Supermarket opened in Spring 2013, a chip shop, and an Indian restaurant. Walsall wood is also the home of Brother Barber Walsall, located on salters road, streets corner.

Walsall Wood Library is located in the former Neighbourhood Office building at the junction of Coppice Road and High Street. There have been talks to move this to the Redeveloped Oak Park Leisure Centre. Planning approval has been granted for its redevelopment and work is due to begin early 2015 for re-opening later the same year. (Plans accepted were the plans submitted in 14 July). Further details can be found via the Walsall Council Website or visiting the Leisure Centre itself. The site of the former library building on Lichfield Road has also undergone redevelopment. A purpose built car showroom was completed in Summer 2013.

Transport
Walsall Wood is served by four bus routes which are:
10 (National Express West Midlands), between Walsall  and Brownhills
936 (National Express West Midlands), between Walsall  and Birmingham
937/937A (National Express West Midlands), between Brownhills  and Birmingham
X35 (Diamond Bus) between Walsall and Lichfield.

There is also Diamond Bus service 35 from Walsall to Lichfield via Aldridge which runs at the top end of Walsall Wood near Streets Corner. 

Service X35 was previously numbered 991 and was once part of a much longer route, 901. This "Timesaver" branded route, operated by West Midlands Travel, started in 1986 and ran the same route as the current X35 but then continued to Birmingham via Sutton Coldfield. The service was split a few years later into the 991 and 901. The 991 ran every 90 minutes while the 901 was later withdrawn from serving Lichfield. 

Walsall Wood railway station was opened in 1884, the station served the residents of Walsall Wood until 1930 when the passenger services were withdrawn although the odd DMU service would see passenger activity at the closed station. The line continued to serve as a goods line until the closure of the line in 1962. The line through the station was considered to be more of a colliery traffic route then a passenger service. The station is occupied by a park and houses now occupy the trackbed. Although some track is still preserved as either a footpath or agriculture.

References

External links

Aldridge-Brownhills Conservative Association The Conservative constituency association.

Walsall
Villages in the West Midlands (county)